Jason Garey (born July 19, 1984) is an American soccer player.

Career

Youth and College
Born in Baton Rouge, Louisiana, Garey, who grew up in Gonzales, Louisiana, attended St. Amant High School and played for the Baton Rouge Soccer Club. He continues to hold Louisiana high school records for most goals in a season (73) and in a career (170). Garey played college soccer at the University of Maryland. In his senior season, he scored 22 goals in 25 games, was named a first-team All-American, won the Hermann Trophy as the best college player, and led the Terrapins to the College Cup.

Professional
Garey was drafted by Columbus Crew in the first round (third overall) at the 2006 MLS SuperDraft and was with the club when they won the 2008 MLS Cup.

After five seasons with Columbus Crew, Garey's rights were traded to Houston Dynamo in exchange for a fourth-round draft pick in the 2015 MLS SuperDraft. At the end of the 2011 season, Houston declined his 2012 contract option and he entered the 2011 MLS Re-Entry Draft. Garey was not selected in the draft and became a free agent.

Garey signed with Carolina RailHawks of the North American Soccer League on January 20, 2012.

Honors

Columbus Crew
 Major League Soccer Eastern Conference Championship: 2008
 Major League Soccer MLS Cup: 2008
 Major League Soccer Supporter's Shield: 2008, 2009

Beyond the pitch
Garey is a spokesman for Vanishing Paradise, a joint campaign by Ducks Unlimited and the National Wildlife Federation to raise awareness for wetlands preservation in his home state of Louisiana.

Garey serves as color commentator for North Carolina FC television broadcasts. He also serves on the board of directors for NCFC Youth.

In 2012, Garey self published Geauxing Galt, a libertarian novel inspired by Atlas Shrugged.

References

External links
 
 lahssoccer.com

1984 births
Living people
American soccer players
Maryland Terrapins men's soccer players
Columbus Crew players
Houston Dynamo FC players
North Carolina FC players
Sportspeople from Baton Rouge, Louisiana
Major League Soccer players
North American Soccer League players
Columbus Crew draft picks
Association football forwards
Soccer players from Louisiana
People from Gonzales, Louisiana
Hermann Trophy men's winners
All-American men's college soccer players
NCAA Division I Men's Soccer Tournament Most Outstanding Player winners